"Vit som en snö"  is a song by Swedish singer Måns Zelmerlöw and Pernilla Andersson. The song was released as a digital download on 29 November 2010 through Warner Music Group as the second single from his third studio album Christmas with Friends (2010). The song is also included on the album Kära vinter (2011). The song did not enter the Swedish Singles Chart, but peaked to number 19 on the Sweden Heatseeker Songs.

Track listing

Chart performance

Weekly charts

Release history

References

2010 songs
2010 singles
Måns Zelmerlöw songs
Warner Music Group singles